Kanlaon, also known as Mount Kanlaon and Kanlaon Volcano, is an active stratovolcano and the highest mountain on the island of Negros in the Philippines, as well as the highest point in the Visayas, with an elevation of  above sea level. Mount Kanlaon ranks as the 42nd-highest peak of an island in the world.

It is one of the active volcanoes in the Philippines and part of the Pacific Ring of Fire.

Physical features
Just below and north of the summit is the active Lugud crater. North of Lugud is a  caldera known as Margaja Valley, with a small, often seasonal crater lake.

The volcano has three hot springs on its slopes: Mambukal Hot Springs on the northwest, Bucalan Hot Spring and Bungol Hot Spring. Its adjacent volcanic edifices are Mount Silay and Mount Mandalagan, north of Kanlaon.

Canlaon, the component city that has jurisdiction on the Negros Oriental side of the volcano, lies on its lower slope about  ESE of the summit.

Hiking Destination and Trails

The volcano is a favorite spot for mountain climbers and is the centerpiece of Mount Kanlaon Natural Park, a national park originally established on August 8, 1934.

The hiking trails usually start in the center of the Guintubdan village. Locals have been active in international cooperation working with several European institutions to introduce the pioneering Unified Hiking Marker System as the first inland tourist location in the Philippines. The system is unified across a number of countries. This makes the mountain more attractive for tourists in an ecologically responsible way.

Trails & Hiking Markers System 
In 2016, first three hiking trails have been marked, with additional and more extensive trails added in 2017 from the center of the Guintubdan village including a trail to the top. The works have been implemented by the Mendel University, in cooperation with De La Salle University Bacolod and DENR. The project has been financed by the Embassy of the Czech Republic in Manila in the framework of Czech Aid Development program. Three color-coded trails using the colors of the Philippine flag were opened:

 Red Trail from Guintubdan to Buslugan Falls (marked in 2016)
 Yellow Trail from Guintubdan to Oro Falls (marked in 2016)
 Blue Trail from Guintubdan to Salas Park new Pavilion (marked in 2016)
 Red Trail from Guintubdan to Mt. Kanla-On Summit (marked in 2017)
 Adventure Trail and additional new trails (marked in 2017)

Hiking Markers Standard on Mt. Kanla-on
This system uses three bars – usually one color in between two white bars, with different meanings attached to different colors: red indicates the most difficult or summit trails, blue for difficult trails and yellow and green for easy or interconnecting trails. These marks may be posted on wooden boards or metallic plates.
Basic trail markers are square, 10x10 cm in size. The volunteers marking these trails usually prepare sheet metal or cardboard matrices to keep the signs uniform in size. Any change of direction is marked with arrows of the same color and similar design.

Eruptions
The most active volcano in central Philippines, Kanlaon has erupted 30 times since 1819. Eruptions are typically phreatic of small-to-moderate size that produce minor ash falls around the volcano. In 1902, the eruption was classified as Strombolian, typified by the ejection of incandescent cinders, lapilli, lava bombs and gas fumes. However, its eruptive history has not yet been recorded and larger Vesuvian eruptions generated by this stratovolcano has not yet been known.

Volcanic activity at Kanlaon is continuously monitored by the Philippine Institute of Volcanology and Seismology (PHIVOLCS), the government's bureau that monitors the volcanoes and earthquakes in the nation, although unlike Mayon and Pinatubo, the volcano has never been studied in-depth and its age is not yet accurately calculated. Kanlaon Volcano Observatory is located at the campus of La Carlota City College in the barangay of Cubay, La Carlota City in Negros Occidental.

1996 Kanlaon Incident 
On August 10, 1996, 24 mountain climbers hiked the volcano when Kanlaon erupted without warning, killing British student Julian Green and Filipinos Jamrain Tragico and Neil Perez, who were trapped near the summit close to the crater. The local authorities rescued 17 others, including 10 Belgians, another British climber and six Filipinos while Edwin Ematong, a member of the Negros Mountaineering Club Inc. and who, along with his cousin Neil Perez, guided the British Nationals survived this eruption. He descended the volcano ahead of his group that fateful day.

One of the rescued Belgians, Caroline Verlinde, said she and her group were about to leave a site near the crater rim when suddenly the volcano ejected ash, stones and hot gas. She ran to a tree for cover and saw her friends being hit by falling hot tephra. She said their Filipino guide told them the smoke billowing out from the crater "was just ordinary."

Recent volcanic activity

2001 
PHIVOLCS noted in a March 22, 2001 report that since January 2001, earthquake clusters or occurrences had been recorded by the seismic monitoring network around the volcano. These earthquakes might had signified a reactivation of the volcanic system at depth and could be a precursor to more vigorous activity, such as ash explosions. This interpretation was based on similar earthquake clusters manifested prior to the August 10, 1996 phreatic explosion from the active summit crater of the volcano. In view of the possibility of a sudden ash ejection, PHIVOLCS recommended the immediate suspension of all treks to the summit crater until further notice. As an additional precaution, the pre-defined 4 kilometer radius permanent danger zone (PDZ) should be avoided at all times.

2002 
An increase in seismic activity during February to April 2002 was followed by raising alert on the volcano. An ash eruption occurred on November 28, 2002.

2003 
On March 17, 2003, a gray plume was observed above Kanlaon Volcano. A total of 46 minor ash ejections were recorded. After July 23, 2003, only weak emission was noted and seismic activity returned to normal.

2005 
A fine layer of ash fell on the town of Cabagnaan  SW of the crater. Ash emissions began again on March 20 and caused minor ash fall in the municipality of Guintubdan  W of the volcano. Until April 4, occasional ash eruptions reached 1 km above the volcano, and small ash fall was reported in the municipalities of La Castellana ( SW of the crater), Upper Sag-ang, Yubo ( SW), and Guintubdan ( WNW). Ash eruptions stopped after May 25, 2005.

2006 
On June 3, 2006, Kanlaon again exhibited restiveness and spewed steam and ash. Alert Level 1 was issued on June 12, 2006. Until July 25, a total of 23 ash eruptions were reported. No significant seismic activity had occurred before or after the ash emissions, indicating the explosions were near surface hydrothermal events.

2008 
On February 10, 2008, PHIVOLCS issued an alert stating that the seismic network at Kanlaon Volcano recorded a total of 21 low frequency volcanic earthquakes (LFVQ) during the past 24 hours. Due to the increasing number of recorded volcanic earthquakes, PHIVOLCS raised Kanlaon Volcano's alert status from Alert Level 0 to Alert Level 1, which means the volcano is at slightly elevated unrest and volcanic activity could lead to steam and ash ejections.  A  Permanent Danger Zone (PDZ) was maintained around the volcano, as sudden explosions may occur without warning, but no eruptions occurred.

2009 
In the 8 days from August 23 to September 1, 257 volcanic earthquakes were recorded. Usual seismic activity during quiet periods is 0 to 4 quakes in any 24-hour period. Epicenters of the recorded quakes were clustered at the north-west slope which may indicate movement of an active local fault at the slope induced by pressure beneath the volcano. Surface observations did not show any significant change in the steam emission from the crater. PHIVOLCS maintained the alert status at Level 0.

2015 
On November 23, Kanlaon had a small, steam-driven explosion. PHIVOLCS raised the alert level to 1 (mild restiveness). On December 12, 2015, Kanlaon had two low energy ash eruption. The volcano is still in the state of unrest. On December 27, 2015, an ash eruption occurred at Kanlaon's active crater. Light ashfall were reported in some barangays near Kanlaon Volcano.

On January 2, people in Hinigaran got sick. Many suffered from a respiratory illness with cough and flu-like symptoms.

2016 
According to the police department of Canlaon, several fire balls, which were coming from the crater of the volcano, started to flow following a booming sound and causing a bush fire. PHIVOLCS issued alert level number 1. No casualties were reported.

2020 
On March 11, 2020, PHIVOLCS raised the volcano's alert level from 0 to 1 due to its abnormal activities since March 9, 2020. 80 volcanic earthquakes has been plotted since then.
On June 21, 2020, the Kanlaon volcano showed some signs of increased unrest. By June 22, 2020, the Kanlaon volcano's activity continued, with a series of tectonic earthquakes ranging from M3.2 to M4.7. A total of 278 earthquakes was observed for a 72-hour period (from June 21, 8AM – June 24, 8AM), possibly related to the magmatic activity underneath the volcano. Earthquakes continued, with steam and fumarolic activity rising 200–300 meters above. PHIVOLCS reminded the public to stay away to the 4-km PDZ (Permanent Danger Zone) around the volcano, as abnormal conditions and sudden phreatic explosions might occur.

Mythology
Mount Kanlaon is surrounded by a variety of myths. A story states that its vicinity was home to a nation ruled by a datu (king or leader) named Laon. The volcano was said to be a former home to a dragon-like monster which was slain by the youthful epic hero, Kan, who was an intimate friend and lover of Laon. Together, Kan and Laon defeated the monster, utilizing strength and wit and Laon's magic birang, which can produce anything the wielder wants.

In another story, after many years since the event of Kan and Laon, a king of smallfolk named Harisabóqued (Hiligaynon: Hari-sa-Bukid) was said to have ruled Mount Kanlaon. Harisabóqued is said to have an army of smallfolk, who aids him in tending a huge tobacco plantation around Mount Kanlaon. He also established the boundaries between the humans and the smallfolk, of which the sacred realms constitute the entire circumference of Mount Kanlaon. The king would eventually retreat himself inside the volcano after a series of events where the humans failed to keep their sacred vows.

In another story, after the two events mentioned, the supreme goddess of the Hiligaynon people, Kanlaon (not to be confused with the names of the epic heroes Kan and Laon), chose to change her abode from Mount Madia-as into Mount Kanlaon. The goddess is said to come out from the mountain before, however, due to mankind's dreadful attitude towards the environment, she closed the divine portals which were the entrances of the volcano. She is believed to still reside within Kanlaon Volcano.

In another account which combined the stories of Harisabóqued and Kanlaon, it is said that Kanlaon, who was depicted in the particular version as male, ruled over the smallfolk and set the boundaries between the volcano and the people. The people eventually disregarded the boundary and their sacred vow, which led to Kanlaon to withdraw himself inside the volcano. Since then, the volcano was protected by the magkupo, a huge serpent with a rooster's crown and  powerful crow.

See also
 List of active volcanoes in the Philippines
 List of protected areas of the Philippines

References

External links

 Philippine Institute of Volcanology and Seismology (PHIVOLCS) — Kanlaon Volcano Page
 

Volcanoes of Negros Island
Landforms of Negros Occidental
Landforms of Negros Oriental
Active volcanoes of the Philippines
Stratovolcanoes of the Philippines
Subduction volcanoes
Volcanic crater lakes
Sacred mountains